There are many classes of roads in Ontario, Canada, including provincial highways (which is further broken down into the King's Highways, the 400-series, Secondary Highways, Tertiary Highways, and the 7000-series), county (or regional) roads, and local municipal routes.

Provincial highways

County and regional roads

City roads and streets

Chatham-Kent

Hamilton

Kawartha Lakes

London

Markham

Mississauga

Ottawa

Toronto

Vaughan

Windsor

See also